Each team can register a squad of 23 players, three of whom must be goalkeepers. Between the completion of the group stage and the start of the knockout stage, teams which reach the quarter-finals can replace up to four players in their squads but must be drawn from a provisional list of 35 players.

A list of provisional squads featuring 35 players, consisting of short-listed players, was released on 31 May 2013.  The statistics in the tables below represent player profiles as of the beginning of the tournament. See individual player articles for current statistics.

Group A

Canada
Head Coach:  Colin Miller

Martinique
Head Coach:  Patrick Cavelan

Mexico
Head Coach:  José Manuel de la Torre

Panama
Head Coach:  Julio Dely Valdés

Group B

El Salvador
Head Coach:  Agustín Castillo

Haiti
Head Coach:  Israel Blake Cantero

Honduras
Head Coach:  Luis Suárez

Trinidad and Tobago
Head Coach:  Stephen Hart

Group C

Belize
Head Coach:  Ian Mork

Costa Rica
Head Coach:  Jorge Luis Pinto

Cuba
Head Coach:  Walter Benítez

United States
Head Coach:  Jürgen Klinsmann

Notes
Replacements after squad submission:

Replacements after group stage:

References

CONCACAF Gold Cup squads
Squads